Franco Ermanno Colombo (born October 10, 1917 in Legnano) was an Italian professional football player.

1917 births
Year of death missing
People from Legnano
Italian footballers
Serie A players
Serie B players
A.C. Legnano players
Inter Milan players
S.S.D. Lucchese 1905 players
Footballers from Lombardy
Association football defenders
S.G. Gallaratese A.S.D. players
Sportspeople from the Metropolitan City of Milan